The Leavers is Lisa Ko's first novel, published on May 2, 2017.

Background
Ko’s novel was inspired by a 2009 New York Times article describing an undocumented immigrant from Fuzhou, China, who was arrested at a Greyhound station in Florida on her way to a new job and spent a year and a half in detention.

Plot 
Told in four parts, the novel begins as Deming Guo's mother Polly suddenly disappears from the family's New York City apartment without warning. Deming is placed into foster care, ultimately to be adopted by a suburban couple, Kay and Peter. Five hours away from the city in Ridgeburough, Deming Guo becomes Daniel Wilkinson. Deming/Daniel searches for a sense of connection, belonging, and identity in a new home with a new family. 

Part II introduces Polly’s story.

Reception 
Writing for The New York Times, Gish Jen praised the novel for taking the headline-news of immigration and “remind[ing] us that beyond [that] lie messy, brave, extraordinary, ordinary lives.” At the same time, Jen felt the prose was overly expository and that some conservative plot points mark “this book as one that takes risks but then hedges its bets.” 

Reviewing the novel for The Guardian, Arifa Akbar felt, “The Leavers ... themes of displacement and deportation carry deep and desperately urgent resonances far beyond America, and fiction. Ko movingly captures Polly and Deming’s liminal presence in the immigrant community, on the margins of society in overcrowded apartments, in nail parlours and factories, who are always there yet invisible to the rest of us.”

Awards 
The Leavers received the PEN/Bellwether Prize for Socially Engaged Fiction and a nomination for National Book Award for Fiction.

References 

2017 American novels
Novels about immigration
Algonquin Books books